The River Avon is in the south of England, rising in Wiltshire, flowing through that county's city of Salisbury and then west Hampshire, before reaching the English Channel through Christchurch Harbour in the Bournemouth, Christchurch and Poole conurbation of Dorset.

It is sometimes known as the Salisbury Avon or the Hampshire Avon to distinguish it from namesakes across Great Britain. It is one of the rivers in Britain in which the phenomenon of anchor ice has been observed. The Avon is thought to contain more species of fish than any other river in Britain. Long-farmed pastures and planted, arable fields line much of the valley; an indication of the wealth these brought to landowners is in ten large listed houses with statutorily recognised and protected parks. Many prehistoric sites and broader "landscapes" are found on either side of the river, the largest being the World Heritage Site zone of Stonehenge, Avebury and Associated Sites, followed by the Old Sarum knoll fortification and the Thornham Down prehistoric and medieval landscape.

Etymology
The river's name is a tautology: Avon is the Proto-Brythonic word meaning "river".

Course

The Avon begins as two separate bodies of water. The western arm rises to the east of Devizes, draining the Vale of Pewsey, and is joined by Etchilhampton Water which rises in the Bishops Cannings area and flows south past Etchilhampton and through Patney.  The eastern arm rises at Easton Royal, east of Pewsey, and is joined by the Woodborough Stream which rises at Alton Priors and flows south through Woodborough and North Newnton.

The two branches merge at Upavon, flowing southwards across Salisbury Plain through Durrington, Amesbury and Salisbury. To the south of Salisbury the river enters the Hampshire Basin, flowing along the western edge of the New Forest through Fordingbridge and Ringwood, meeting up with the River Stour at Christchurch, to flow into Christchurch Harbour. The harbour opens into the English Channel past a cluster of small mouths of brooks from the New Forest and a broad sandbank, which is all built up as the Mudeford part of the harbour.

All the significant direct and indirect tributaries of the Avon, including the Nadder, Wylye, Bourne and Ebble, converge within a short distance around Salisbury.

A short distance north from the river's western source is Morgan's Hill, which marks the hydrological triple divide of Great Britain, where rainfall drains into the English Channel (via this River Avon), the Atlantic Ocean (via the Bristol Avon and Severn Estuary) and the North Sea (via the Kennet and Thames).

About half of the river is in Wiltshire; the rest is split between Hampshire and (since the 1974 boundary changes) Dorset.

As two Avons drain parts of Wiltshire, the river is popularly known as the Hampshire Avon or the Salisbury Avon (and the other as the Bristol Avon).

17th-century navigation 
 
Construction of a navigation from Salisbury to Christchurch was authorised by the River Avon Navigation (Christchurch to New Sarum) Act 1664. Work began in 1675 and the route was completed in 1684, but it fell out of use around 1715. Canalised channels were dug to straighten sections of the river, including one through Britford parish just below Salisbury; a lock survives on this section near Longford Castle, having been rebuilt in brick as a pound lock soon after the original flash lock was damaged by flooding in the early 18th century.

Path
The Avon Valley Path follows the river between Salisbury and Christchurch.

Rights of way
Canoeists seeking lawful passage as high as Salisbury have attempted to invoke the 1644 Navigation Act in their favour. However, the Act was subject to enabling works, most of which were never completed, hence the right is disputed. Responsibility for delivery was given to private undertakers in the names of Hodges, Bennett and Dennett, who were to fund the canalisation between the places. They were allowed to charge their investment at 10% interest rate and could take full commercial advantage, which tripartite agreements from 1684 and 1685 evidence. The House of Commons Journal of 31 January 1699 records that the freeholders, inhabitants and residents of Ibsley and Fordingbridge petitioned the House on the fact that they could not comply with the 1664 Act and were never likely to do so. The House sided with them and effectively declared its view of the law, the finality of which, lacking royal assent, the law of rights of way is unclear on but makes more likely the view that the Act became voidable as the works to canalise the Avon were never implemented. Indecisive court cases were brought in 1737 and 1772 to enforce the alleged but not exercised right (to benefit barge owners).

Landowner's houses with parkland

The valley from north to south has the following houses with large parks and gardens, significantly funded in their original form by the rich, mixed agriculture from the little-wooded upper valley plains and sides:
Conock Manor, Chirton
Amesbury Abbey
Lake House, Wilsford
Heale House, Middle Woodford
Wilton House (including orangery, loggietta, whispering seat, classical bridges, follies, columns, Holbein porch, James Wyatt architecture)
Longford Castle (including two listed bridges over the river, parterre, statues of fame and Diana)
Trafalgar Park, Downton (including chapel)
Hale Park (includes lodge, barns and granaries)
Breamore House (includes tower, and museum cottage)
 Somerley (includes salmon huts, farmhouses and extensive water meadows)
Avon Tyrrell House, Sopley (includes lodge and gazebo)

Scheduled monument landscapes

The largest of this type is England's main World Heritage Site of this category, which includes Stonehenge.

Others include massive earthworks at Old Sarum, and across the larger, separate Thornham Down area.

Settlements

Wiltshire
 

 Upavon
 East and West Chisenbury
 Enford
 Coombe
 Fittleton
 Haxton
 Netheravon
 Figheldean
 Milston
 Durrington
 Bulford
 Amesbury

 West Amesbury
 Wilsford cum Lake
 Great Durnford
 The Woodfords
 Little Durnford

 Stratford-sub-Castle
 Salisbury

 Britford
 Bodenham
 Charlton All Saints
 Downton

Hampshire

 Breamore
 Burgate
 Fordingbridge
 Bickton
 Ibsley
 Ringwood
 Sopley

Dorset

 St Ives
 Burton
Fairmile
 Christchurch

Designations 
In 1993 the Avon valley in Hampshire between Bickton (downstream of Fordingbridge) and Christchurch was designated as a Site of Special Scientific Interest (SSSI).

In 1996 almost the entire river, from Patney (Wiltshire) to Christchurch, together with its tributaries the Wylye, Nadder, Bourne and Dockens Water, was designated as the River Avon System SSSI.

Conservation initiatives in the 2000s
A four-year project called STREAM began in September 2005. This £1 million project was designed to benefit the habitats of species such as water-crowfoot, Atlantic salmon, brook lamprey, sea lamprey, bullhead, Desmoulin's whorl snail, gadwall and Cygnus columbianus (Berwick's swan). A sister project called Living River ran from 2006 to 2010, aiming to providing better access and recreation, as well as aid biodiversity. Both these projects were shortlisted for the 2009 Thiess International Riverprize, competing against four other projects: the Yellow River in China, Lake Simcoe in Canada, the Polochic Basin in Guatemala and the Lower Owens River in the USA. The prize for 2009 was awarded to Lake Simcoe.

See also

Other Rivers Avon
Rivers of the United Kingdom

References

External links

Rivers of Dorset
Rivers of Hampshire
Rivers of Wiltshire
Nature Conservation Review sites
Rivers of Christchurch, Dorset
Sites of Special Scientific Interest in Hampshire
Ramsar sites in England
1Avon